Otto Schöniger (28 December 1889 – July 1958) was a Czechoslovak equestrian. He competed at the 1924 Summer Olympics, the 1928 Summer Olympics and the 1936 Summer Olympics.

References

External links
 

1889 births
1958 deaths
Czechoslovak male equestrians
Olympic equestrians of Czechoslovakia
Equestrians at the 1924 Summer Olympics
Equestrians at the 1928 Summer Olympics
Equestrians at the 1936 Summer Olympics
People from Pelhřimov District
Sportspeople from the Vysočina Region